Morgan Gannon (born 2 December 2003) is an English professional rugby league footballer who plays as a  forward for the Leeds Rhinos in the Betfred Super League.

Background
Gannon was born in Halifax, West Yorkshire, England. His brother Jacob Gannon plays for the Warrington Wolves in the Super League and they are both sons of former player Jim Gannon.

He played his junior rugby league for Siddal.

Playing career
In 2021 he made professional début for Leeds against St Helens in the 2021 Challenge Cup.

References

External links
Leeds Rhinos profile
SL profile

2003 births
Living people
English rugby league players
Leeds Rhinos players
Rugby league players from Halifax, West Yorkshire
Rugby league second-rows